Caloptilia macropleura is a moth of the family Gracillariidae. It is known from Ethiopia and South Africa.

References

macropleura
Moths of Africa
Insects of Ethiopia
Moths described in 1932